Vexillum (Pusia) unifascialis, common name : the Golden Mitre,  is a species of small sea snail, marine gastropod mollusk in the family Costellariidae, the ribbed miters.

The epithet is sometimes spelled as "unifasciale" 

There is one subspecies : Vexillum unifascialis affinis (Reeve, 1844)  and one forma : Vexillum (Pusia) unifasciale venustula (f) (Reeve, L.A., 1844)

Description
The shell size varies between 8 mm and 29 mm.

Distribution
This species is distributed in the Red Sea, the Persian Gulf  and in the Indian Ocean along the Mascarene Basin in the Indo-West Pacific and in the Pacific Ocean along the Philippines, Japan, Australia, Papua New Guinea and Polynesia.

References

 Turner H. 2001. Katalog der Familie Costellariidae Macdonald, 1860. Conchbooks. 1-100 page(s): 66

unifascialis
Gastropods described in 1811